Fazlani Academy of Business Sciences (previously Fazlani Altius Business School & popularly referred to as ‘FABS’) is an autonomous Center of Corporate Excellence and Leadership. The main objective of the Institution is to bridge the industry-academia gap by identifying, mentoring, training the future leaders ready to lead the industry.

The institution has campus in Mumbai.

References

 http://www.business-standard.com/article/press-releases/fazlani-altius-business-school-launches-unique-experientially-focused-112042700071_1.html
 http://www.dnaindia.com/mumbai/report-b-schools-open-shop-sans-nod-1682825
 http://www.business-standard.com/article/management/new-b-schools-take-slow-and-steady-steps-towards-growth-113052200941_1.html
 http://timesofindia.indiatimes.com/entertainment/events/mumbai/Fazlani-LAcademie-Globale-inaugural-event-held-in-Mumbai/articleshow/46244144.cms
 http://www.youthincmag.com/explore-experiential-learning/

Business schools in Mumbai